Shangguan Jiqing (born March 1963) is a Chinese politician who spent his whole career in his home-province Shaanxi. He served as mayor of Xi'an between 2016 and 2018 but appeared to have been embroiled in a local scandal involving several other high-ranking officials. He was demoted to an insignificant position and put under probation by the disciplinary organs of the Chinese Communist Party in late 2018.

Career
Shangguan Jiqing was born in March 1963 in Qian County, Shaanxi. 

After graduating from Shaanxi Business School in August 1980, Shangguan Jiqing entered politics as a local official in Xiyang Town of Sanyuan County. Shangguan Jiqing joined the Chinese Communist Party in April 1982. In July 1982 he was appointed as an official in the county's Bureau of Finance and over a period of ten years worked his way up to the position of Director. 

In January 1995 he was transferred to Xunyi County and served as its deputy magistrate. In December 1995 he was promoted to become the Magistrate, a position he held until August 1998, when he was transferred again to Bin County. He served as magistrate from August 1998 to October 1999, and Communist Party Secretary, the top political position in the county, from October 1999 to December 2002. 

He became the vice-mayor of Xianyang in April 2004 and served until November 2004. He was deputy director of Shaanxi Provincial Department of Finance in November 2004, and held that office until August 2008. 

In August 2008 he was appointed vice-mayor of Baoji, and three years later promoted to mayor. He then served as Communist Party Secretary, the top political position in the city, from 2013 to 2015. 

In October 2015 he was promoted to Deputy Communist Party Secretary of Xi'an, capital of northwest China's Shaanxi province. He concurrently served as mayor in February 2016.

Downfall
On October 29, 2018, Shangguan Jiqing was placed on probation within the Communist Party. The party suspended his party membership and also demoted him. The government confiscated his illegal gains.

Shangguan Jiqing was removed from the Communist Party and government's websites on November 2, 2018 without any official explanation. On November 5, 2018, he resigned from the mayor of Xi'an. On November 9, he was removed from membership of China's top parliamentary body, the National People's Congress. Soon after, former Shaanxi party chief Zhao Zhengyong was also put under investigation. It was revealed in state television footage in January 2019 that Shangguan had been handed a two-year suspension from the party and demoted to a "non-leading deputy department level position," which was two grades lower than his previous position.

References

External links
 Biography of Shangguan Jiqing 

1963 births
Central Party School of the Chinese Communist Party alumni
Northwest University (China) alumni
Living people
People's Republic of China politicians from Shaanxi
Chinese Communist Party politicians from Shaanxi
Mayors of Xi'an